The Downs Carnegie Library in the city of Downs in Osborne County, Kansas is a Carnegie library which was listed on the National Register of Historic Places in 1987.

A library association was organized in 1903 to seek a Carnegie Foundation grant. It received a $6,140 grant in 1905.

The one-story red brick building was designed by architect A.T. Simmons of Bloomington, Illinois in an eclectic style. It has a raised rusticated limestone block foundation.

It was listed on the National Register as part of a study on Carnegie libraries in Kansas.

As of 2022, it is still the Downs public library.

References

External links

National Register of Historic Places in Osborne County, Kansas
Buildings and structures completed in 1906
Carnegie libraries in Kansas